Judson Canfield (January 24, 1759 – February 5, 1840) was a Connecticut state legislator and state court judge.

Born in New Milford, Connecticut, Canfield graduated from Yale College in 1782, and was admitted to the bar in 1785. He entered into private practice in Sharon, Connecticut. He was elected to the Connecticut General Assembly in 1802, and served until 1809, thereafter serving in the Connecticut State Senate from 1810 to 1815. He simultaneously served as a county court judge for Litchfield County, Connecticut, from 1808 to 1815.

Canfield "was one of the purchasers of the school lands in Ohio", and the village of Canfield, Ohio, county seat of Mahoning County, Ohio, was named after him, commemorating his role as a land agent.

Canfield died in New York City, at the age of 81.

References

People from New Milford, Connecticut
1759 births
1840 deaths
Yale College alumni
Members of the Connecticut General Assembly
Connecticut state senators
Connecticut state court judges